Logan Township is the name of some places in the U.S. state of Pennsylvania:
Logan Township, Blair County, Pennsylvania
Logan Township, Clinton County, Pennsylvania
Logan Township, Huntingdon County, Pennsylvania

Pennsylvania township disambiguation pages